1973 Emmy Awards may refer to:

 25th Primetime Emmy Awards, the 1973 Emmy Awards ceremony honoring primetime programming
 1st International Emmy Awards, the 1973 Emmy Awards ceremony honoring international programming

 
Emmy Award ceremonies by year